Tiger claw (Erythrina variegata) is a tree native to tropical areas.

Tiger claw, Tiger Claw, or Tiger's Claw may also refer to:

 Tiger Claw (Fu Jow Pai), a Chinese martial arts style
 Tiger claw (weapon), a claw-like South Asian weapon known as a bagh nakh
 Tiger Claw (G.I. Joe), a fictional character in the G.I. Joe universe
 Tiger Claw (Teenage Mutant Ninja Turtles), a fictional character in the 2012 series of Teenage Mutant Ninja Turtles
 Tiger Claws, a 1992 film directed by Kelly Makin
 Tiger's Claw, the mothership in the Wing Commander video game